Patrik Norén (born December 1, 1992) is a Swedish professional ice hockey defenseman currently playing for Leksands IF in the Swedish Hockey League (SHL).

Playing career
Norén played for Leksands IF since moving from Skedvi/Säter IF in 2008–09 until 2014, when he signed with Timrå IK. He played two seasons with Skellefteå AIK in the SHL before returning to Leksands IF in the 2020–21 season.

Career statistics

References

External links

1992 births
Almtuna IS players
Leksands IF players
Living people
People from Säter Municipality
Skellefteå AIK players
Swedish ice hockey defencemen
Timrå IK players
Sportspeople from Dalarna County